Carlo Boggio (10 May 1931 – 12 July 2017) was an Italian politician who served as Mayor of Vercelli (1970–1975) and Senator for four legislatures (1976–1992).

References

1931 births
2017 deaths
Mayors of Vercelli
Senators of Legislature VII of Italy
Senators of Legislature VIII of Italy
Senators of Legislature IX of Italy
Senators of Legislature X of Italy
20th-century Italian politicians
Christian Democracy (Italy) politicians
People from Vercelli